Jonathan Alejandro Díaz Rivas (born 11 May 1999) is a Mexican professional footballer who plays as a full-back for Liga de Expansión MX team UAT.

Career statistics

Club

References

External links
 
 
 

Living people
1999 births
Association football defenders
Santos Laguna footballers
Liga MX players
Footballers from Coahuila
Mexican footballers
Sportspeople from Monclova